Niall Inman (born 6 February 1978) in Wakefield, England, is an Irish retired professional footballer who played as a midfielder for Peterborough United in the Football League.

Honours
Republic of Ireland
FIFA World Youth Championship Third Place: 1997

External links

1978 births
Living people
Footballers from Wakefield
Association football midfielders
Peterborough United F.C. players
Stevenage F.C. players
Kettering Town F.C. players
Grantham Town F.C. players
Mildenhall Town F.C. players
English Football League players
Republic of Ireland association footballers
Republic of Ireland under-21 international footballers